The Ghetto Mafia is an American hip hop group from Decatur, Georgia, United States, composed of Nino and Wicked. Formed in 1993, the Ghetto Mafia signed to local hip hop label, Ichiban Records, who then released their debut album, Draw the Line on April 26, 1994. The group then released 1995's Full Blooded Niggaz through Triad Records before joining Fully Loaded Records in 1996. With Fully Loaded, Ghetto Mafia released 1997's Straight from the Dec and their most successful album to date, 1998's On da Grind, which peaked at 169 on the Billboard 200. After a seven-year hiatus, they released Da Return... of Ghetto Mafia in 2005. In 2016, Ghetto Mafia returned with a new single, "Elephant in the Room".

Discography

References

African-American musical groups
American hip hop groups
American musical duos
Ichiban Records artists
Hip hop duos
Musical groups from Atlanta
Southern hip hop groups
Gangsta rap groups